Malé Svatoňovice is a municipality and village in Trutnov District in the Hradec Králové Region of the Czech Republic. It has about 1,500 inhabitants. It is known as the birthplace of writer Karel Čapek.

Administrative parts
Villages of Odolov, Petrovice and Strážkovice are administrative parts of Malé Svatoňovice.

Geography
It lies in the Broumov Highlands, in the microregion of Jestřebí hory.

Transport
There is a large railway station, originally built for use in the coal mining industry in 1857–1859.

Sights
On the square of Malé Svatoňovice is the Baroque Church of Seven Joys of the Virgin Mary from 1734. The church was built on the site of seven springs with allegedly healing effects and became a pilgrimage site. The springs now rise in the chapel, which was built in 1732. The church was rebuilt into its current form in 1830–1831. In the upper part of the municipality are Stations of the Cross with seven chapels.

There is the Čapek Brothers Museum in the birth house of Karel Čapek. Karel's brother Josef was the first Czech Cubist, and some of his work is also displayed in the museum.

Notable people
Karel Čapek (1890–1938), writer

References

External links

Postcards of Malé Svatoňovice
Malé Svatoňovice Parish

Villages in Trutnov District